Farah Ali Jama is a Somali economist and politician. From January 2009 to January 2014, he served as the Minister of Finance of Puntland.

Personal life
Jama hails from the autonomous Puntland region in northeastern Somalia. He belongs to the Cali Saleebaan subdivision of the Majeerteen Darod clan.

Jama was previously stationed in Australia.

Minister of Finance

Appointment
On 28 January 2009, Jama was appointed Puntland's Minister of Finance.

Garowe Airport Project
Through its representative to Kuwait, Faisal Hawar, the Puntland government signed an agreement in Dubai with a Kuwaiti company for the development of facilities at the Garowe International Airport as well as at Maakhir University. The deal was valued at $10 million USD and was financed by the Kuwait Fund for Arab Economic Development (KFAED). In October 2013, Puntland Minister of Finance Farah Ali Jama and KFAED Deputy Director Hamad Al-Omar signed a follow-up Grant Agreement in Kuwait. The pact will see the Fund extend $10 million USD, of which $6 million will be allocated to finance the Garowe Airport Project and the remainder will be earmarked for the Maakhir University Project.

End of term
On 28 January 2014, Jama's term as Puntland Minister of Finance ended. He was succeeded at the position by Shire Haji Farah.

See also
Abdulkadir Abdi Hashi

References

Living people
Ethnic Somali people
Somalian economists
Somalian politicians
Somalian Muslims
Year of birth missing (living people)